David Graham Widdicombe (January 1924 – 27 November 2019) was a British Queen's Counsel and political activist.

Born in St Albans, Widdicombe attended St Albans School and then Queens' College, Cambridge.  After one year at university, he was called up to serve in the British Army for the remainder of World War II.

At the 1945 UK general election, Widdicombe stood for the Labour Party in Hythe, aged just 21, taking 35.2% of the vote and second place.  In 1946, he was demobbed and returned to Queens', where in 1947 he was a founder of the Varsity newspaper, becoming editor the following year.  He also served as president of the Cambridge University Labour Club.

Widdicombe stood in Totnes at the 1950 UK general election, taking 29.6% of the vote.  One of his supporters during the campaign was Lee Kuan Yew, a friend from Cambridge, for whom it was his first political campaign.

After graduation, Widdicombe qualified as a barrister with the Inner Temple, specialising in government administration.  He became a Queen's Counsel, a recorder and a deputy High Court judge.  He represented the London Borough of Bromley in the Fares Fair case, and chaired the enquiry which followed the Homes for votes scandal.

References

1924 births
2019 deaths
Alumni of Queens' College, Cambridge
British Army personnel of World War II
Labour Party (UK) parliamentary candidates
People educated at St Albans School, Hertfordshire
People from St Albans
20th-century King's Counsel
21st-century King's Counsel
English King's Counsel
Members of the Inner Temple